Akash Koto Dure is a 2014 Bangladeshi film starring Razzak, Sharmili Ahmed, and debutantes Faria, Mostafa Prokash, and Ankon. The film had its world premiere in Dhaka on 11 February 2014. It began a limited release in the capital on 14 February 2014, and expanded to Mymensingh and Khulna two weeks later.

Cast 
 Razzak
 Sharmili Ahmed
 Faria Shahrin as Pari
 Mostafa Prokash
 Ankon as Bicchu
 Sagor
 Rahim Badsha
 Shuvro
 Mosarraf Hossain
 Kazi Razu
 Shamima Nazneen
 Misha Sawdagor

Music

References

External links
 

Bengali-language Bangladeshi films
2014 films
2010s Bengali-language films
Impress Telefilm films